Joachim I, Prince of Anhalt-Dessau (Dessau, 7 August 1509 – Dessau, 6 December 1561), was a German prince of the House of Ascania and ruler of the principality of Anhalt-Dessau. After 1544 he served as the first ruler of the re-created Anhalt-Dessau.

He was the fourth (but third surviving) son of Ernest I, Prince of Anhalt-Dessau, by his wife Margarete, daughter of Henry I, Duke of Münsterberg-Oels and granddaughter of George of Poděbrady, King of Bohemia.

Life
After the death of his father in 1516, Joachim and his older brothers John V and George III became the new rulers of the Anhalt-Dessau. During the first years of their reign, their mother acted as regent.

In 1544 the brothers agreed to a formal division of the principality. Joachim retained Dessau, this time as sole ruler. The re-created Anhalt-Dessau was much smaller than the earlier principality, however, due to the assignment of many territories to John V and George III.

After his death, unmarried and childless, Joachim was succeeded by his nephews, the rulers of Anhalt-Zerbst.

Princes of Anhalt-Dessau
1509 births
1561 deaths